Miss Israel is a national beauty pageant in Israel. The pageant was founded in 1950, where the winners were sent to Miss Universe. The pageant was also existing to send delegates to Miss World, Miss International, Miss Europe and Miss Asia Pacific International. The 1972 competition was held in Tel Aviv, and had 25 contestants. Ilana Goren was the winner.

Results

External links
Miss Israel 1972 (hebrew)
 Miss Israel-Seventies (hebrew)

1972 beauty pageants
1972 in Israel
Miss Israel
1970s in Tel Aviv